Minuscule 553 (in the Gregory-Aland numbering), ε 331 (in the Soden numbering), is a Greek minuscule manuscript of the New Testament, on parchment. Palaeographically it has been assigned to the 13th century. 
Scrivener labelled it by number 540.

Description 

The codex contains a complete text of the four Gospels on 303 parchment leaves (size ). The writing is in one column per page, 21 lines per page.

According to Scrivener the manuscript is "extremely uninteresting".

Text 

The Greek text of the codex is a representative of the Byzantine text-type. Hermann von Soden classified it to the textual family Kr. Aland placed it in Category V.
According to the Claremont Profile Method it represents the textual family Kr in Luke 1 and Luke 20. In Luke 10 no profile was made. It belongs to subgroup 35.

The Pericope Adulterae (John 7:53-8:11) is marked with an obelus.

History 

The manuscript was held in the monastery Mar Saba. In 1834 Robert Curzon, Lord Zouche, brought this manuscript to England (along with the codices 548, 552, 554). The entire collection of Curzon was bequeathed by his daughter in 1917 to the British Museum, where it had been deposited, by his son, since 1876.

The manuscripts was added to the list of the New Testament minuscule manuscripts by F. H. A. Scrivener (540) and C. R. Gregory (553).

The manuscript was examined by Scrivener, Dean Burgon, and Gregory.

It is currently housed at the British Library (Add MS 39596) in London.

See also 

 List of New Testament minuscules
 Biblical manuscript
 Textual criticism

References

Further reading 
 S. Emmel, Catalogue of Materials for Writing, Early Writings on Tablets and Stones, rolled and other Manuscripts and Oriental Manuscript Books, in the Library of the Honourable Robert Curzon (London 1849).

External links 

Greek New Testament minuscules
13th-century biblical manuscripts
British Library additional manuscripts